Artificial person may refer to 
 Legal person, a concept of legal practice
 Android (robot), a mechanical or biological entity having humanoid form and/or behavior, which is the result of manufacture rather than the normal process of human reproduction